Yanbolaq (also Romanized as Yānbolāq; also known as Yūmbolāgh and Yānbolāgh-e Jadīd) is a village in Takab Rural District, in the Central District of Dargaz County, Razavi Khorasan Province, Iran. At the 2006 census, its population was 83, in 22 families.

References 

Populated places in Dargaz County